Charles Phan (né Toàn Phan; born July 30, 1962) is an American chef, cookbook author, and restauranteur. He is the Executive Chef and founder of "The Slanted Door" restaurant in San Francisco, California and The Slanted Door Group of restaurants. He has published two cookbooks on Vietnamese cuisine.

Early life and education 
Phan grew up in Da Lat, Vietnam after his parents fled China in the 1960s. His surname is of Vietnamese origin and pronounced “fän”. His given name is Toàn but that later changed to Charles when he came to the U.S.. In Vietnam, his father, Quyen Phan, and uncle opened a small grocery store where Phan and his five siblings helped with the family business. This would eventually become the inspiration for his San Francisco restaurant, Wo Hing General Store (opened 2011–closed 2013).

In April 1975, just before Saigon fell to the Vietcong, 13 year old Phan and his family of 8 fled with 400 other people aboard a cargo ship. The ship eventually arrived to Guam where they lived for 18 months. There, Phan’s family was sponsored by an American couple who supported them with housing. While helping his aunt to cook and watching Jacques Pepin's television show, Phan became interested in cooking.

After living in Guam for 18 months, the family immigrated again and settled in San Francisco, California. He was raised in the Chinatown neighborhood and attended Mission High School, graduating in 1979. He was admitted to the University of California, Berkeley’s School of Architecture but dropped out his third year to protest a steep tuition increase. After leaving college early, Phan worked in software sales and other various jobs as he was developing the concept for his first restaurant, The Slanted Door.

Career 
As a young teenager, his curiosity for food began at home while watching his aunt cook and while exploring the food scene of San Francisco. Phan saw an opportunity to introduce American diners to the world of Vietnamese food. He started by hosting small dinners for friends, refining his style of cooking, and developing his restaurant idea.

In 1995, Phan opened his first restaurant, The Slanted Door, as a fine dining restaurant serving Vietnamese cuisine. Its goal was to elevate Vietnamese food with modern design, sustainable local ingredients, quality teas, and wine pairings.

The Slanted Door’s first location was on Valencia Street in the Mission neighborhood of San Francisco. It later moved to the SOMA (South of Market) neighborhood in 2002 and finally to its famous location at the historic Ferry Building in 2005. Slanted Door was one of the first restaurants in San Francisco to feature craft cocktails.

In 2004, Charles was recognized as “Best Chef: California” from the James Beard Foundation. In the years that followed, Phan continued to expand his restaurant group with more restaurants and bars.

Restaurants

Active restaurants 
 Slanted Door San Francisco (1995–present)
 Slanted Door San Ramon (July 2019–present)
 Slanted Door Napa (opening soon)
 Moonset Noodle Shop at Marin Country Mart, Larkspur (opening soon)
 Out the Door at Ferry Building, San Francisco (2005–present)
 Chuck's Takeaway, San Francisco (March 2022–present)
 Rice and Bones at Wurster Hall, University of California, Berkeley (2017–present)

Closed restaurants

Publications

Awards 
 2004 - Phan was recognized as “Best Chef: California” from the James Beard Foundation
 2011 - Phan was inducted into the James Beard Foundation's Who's Who of Food and Beverage in America
 2013 - Phan’s book “Vietnamese Home Cooking” won the IACP (International Association of Culinary Professionals) Cookbook Award for Chefs and Restaurants
 2014 - The Slanted Door was recognized by the James Beard Foundation as an Outstanding Restaurant in America
 2015 - Phan’s book “The Slanted Door” won the IACP (International Association of Culinary Professionals) Cookbook Award in 2013 for Photography

Personal life 
In 1995, Phan married Angkana Kurutach in San Francisco, California where they still reside with their three children.

References

External links 
 

American chefs
1962 births
Living people
People from Chinatown, San Francisco
People from Da Lat
Cookbook writers
Vietnamese emigrants to the United States
Chefs from San Francisco